Pyrgodesmus obscurus, is a species of millipedes in the family Pyrgodesmidae. It is endemic to Sri Lanka.

References

Polydesmida
Millipedes of Asia
Endemic fauna of Sri Lanka
Animals described in 1892